A Fine Romance is an American comedy-drama television series that aired from January 18, 1989, to March 2, 1989 on ABC. The series was filmed on location at various places in Europe.

Premise
A divorced couple work together as hosts of a travel show called Ticket to Ride. Among the locations they traveled to included Paris, Dublin, Budapest, and Malta.

Cast

 Christopher Cazenove as Michael Trent
 Margaret Whitton as Louisa Phillips
 Ernie Sabella as George Shipman
 Kevin Moore as Miles Barrish
 Dinah Lenney as Friday Forrester

Broadcast
The series was originally slated to air as a part of ABC's fall 1988 schedule, Sundays at 8/7c. However, the 1988 Writers Guild of America Strike had officially taken hold by the time of network upfronts in May, and A Fine Romance, along with all other scripted network shows, was affected. Although still featured in ABC's official fall preview reel as airing on Sundays in the fall, the series was soon announced to be on midseason status by the time the fall schedule was released, due to the strike delaying production. To fill the Sunday slot in the fall, ABC commissioned the revival of Mission: Impossible, one of many inexpensive programming alternatives the network was using to fill time during the strike.

The new M:I filled the Sunday 8 p.m. slot for several episodes until being moved to Saturdays in December 1988. Despite the Sunday slot becoming available, A Fine Romance instead premiered in January 1989 on Thursdays at 8/7c, where it replaced the cancelled freshman series Knightwatch. As was the case with the series it replaced, A Fine Romance lost out to The Cosby Show and A Different World on NBC and 48 Hours on CBS, and was pulled after barely two months. Five episodes remain unaired in the US, although the entire run was broadcast in the UK.

Episodes

References

External links

TV.com

1989 American television series debuts
1989 American television series endings
1980s American comedy-drama television series
American Broadcasting Company original programming
English-language television shows